Tryphena and Tryphosa are Christian women briefly mentioned by name in the Bible in Romans 16:12, in which St. Paul writes: "Greet those workers in the Lord, Tryphaena and Tryphosa."

The Roman Martyrology (up through 1960) commemorated them on November 10, saying: "At Iconium in Lycaonia [was the heavenly birth of] the holy women Tryphenna and Tryphosa, who made much progress in Christian perfection through the preaching of blessed Paul and the example of Thecla."

See also
 Romans 16
 Tryphena, as a general name

Notes

References

Women in the New Testament
People in the Pauline epistles
Duos
Epistle to the Romans